American actress, singer, and songwriter Emily Osment has appeared in music videos, films, and television series. Since 2014, Osment has starred as Gabi Diamond in the show Young & Hungry. In 2011, Osment starred in the movie Cyberbully, whose soundtrack includes the song Drift. Her other films include the role of Lilly Truscott in the Disney Hannah Montana: The Movie (2009), Dadnapped (2009), Kiss Me (2014); among others. In 2014, her song "In Case Of Fire" was part of the soundtrack of the film A Daughter's Nightmare, in which she is the protagonist.

In 2009, Osment released her first official music video for the first single "All The Way Up" from her EP All the Right Wrongs. Her second music video was "You Are The Only One", the second single from her EP.

On October 5, 2010 she released her debut album Fight or Flight, Osment released music videos for the singles "Let's Be Friends" and "Lovesick".

Osment has been a guest artist for songs such as "If I Didn't Have You" (2007) with Mitchel Musso, ex co-star of Hannah Montana in which Osment appeared in the music video, and "Hush" (2011) with Josh Ramsay. She also made a guest appearance in the music video "Midnight Romeo" (2009) by the pop and rock band Push Play.

Music videos

Lyric videos

Guest appearances

Commercials

Filmography

As herself

See also
 Emily Osment discography

References

External links 
 

Videographies of American artists
Actress filmographies
American filmographies